This is a list of Newcastle United Football Club seasons played in English football and details the club's achievements in all major competitions, and the top scorers for each season.

Seasons
Before the foundation of the Premier League (from the beginning of the 1992–93 season), Division 1 was the top division in the league. Subsequently, Division 1 became the second tier level.

Overall
Seasons spent at Tier 1 of the football league system: 90
Seasons spent at Tier 2 of the football league system: 29
(up to and including 2021–22)

Key

Pld = Matches played
W = Matches won
D = Matches drawn
L = Matches lost
GF = Goals for
GA = Goals against
Pts = Points
Pos = Final position

Cham = EFL Championship
Div 1 = Football League First Division
Div 2 = Football League Second Division
North = Northern League
Prem = Premier League

QR1 = First qualifying round
QR2 = Second qualifying round
QR3 = Third qualifying round
QR4 = Fourth qualifying round
RInt = Intermediate round
R1 = Round 1
R2 = Round 2
R3 = Round 3
R4 = Round 4

R5 = Round 5
R6 = Round 6
GR1 = First group stage
GR2 = Second group stage
QF = Quarter-finals
SF = Semi-finals
RU = Runners-up
S = Shared
W = Winners

Goals for top scorers in all competitions (Football League or Premier League, FA Cup, League Cup and European) are counted.
Top scorers shown in bold are players who were also top scorers in their division that season.

References

External links
League Record and Topscorers 1892–2010 at toon1892.co.uk

Seasons
 
Newcastle United